Langli may refer to:

Places
 Langli (island), a small marsh island by the coast of Denmark
 Langli, Changsha, a subdistrict in Hunan, China
 Langli, Ukhrul, a village in Manipur, India
 John Christian Langli (born 1961), a Norwegian economist
 Terje Langli (born 1965), Norwegian cross country skier

Stations
Langli station (Changsha Maglev), a maglev station on Changsha Maglev Express. Located in Changsha, China.
Langli Station, a railway station in Langli, Ski, Norway.

See also 
 Langley (disambiguation)